Clement Wareham (23 March 1911 – 30 September 1940) was a New Zealand cricketer. He played in two first-class matches for Wellington in 1934/35.

See also
 List of Wellington representative cricketers

References

External links
 

1911 births
1940 deaths
New Zealand cricketers
Wellington cricketers
Cricketers from Wellington City
New Zealand military personnel killed in World War II